Castra of Răcarii de Jos was a fort in the Roman province of Dacia.

See also
List of castra

Notes

External links

Şantierul arheologic RĂCARI
Roman castra from Romania - Google Maps / Earth 

Roman Dacia
Archaeological sites in Romania
Roman legionary fortresses in Romania
History of Oltenia
Historic monuments in Dolj County